McVey School, also known as the Little Red Schoolhouse, is a historic one-room school located at Sedalia, Pettis County, Missouri.  It was built in 1886, and is a one-story, brick building measuring 19 feet by 29 feet. Also on the property is a contributing privy.  The school closed in 1956 and opened as a museum maintained by the Pettis County Historical Society in 1966.

It was listed on the National Register of Historic Places in 1999.

References

One-room schoolhouses in Missouri
School buildings on the National Register of Historic Places in Missouri
School buildings completed in 1886
Buildings and structures in Pettis County, Missouri
National Register of Historic Places in Pettis County, Missouri